The 2006 European heat wave was a period of exceptionally hot weather that arrived at the end of June 2006 in certain European countries. The United Kingdom, France, Belgium, the Netherlands, Luxembourg, Italy, Poland, the Czech Republic, Hungary, Germany and western parts of Russia were most affected. 

Several records were broken. In the Netherlands, Belgium, Germany, Ireland and the United Kingdom, July 2006 was the warmest month since official measurements began.

Country-by-country

Belgium
Belgium experienced two heat waves in July 2006. Before 1990, a heat wave occurred about once every 8 years. Currently, the country averages one heat wave per year.

In some regions, more particularly Limburg, 36 consecutive days of temperatures above  have been measured in one continuous local heat wave instead of two separate periods of hot weather (according to the official Belgian rules for registering a heat wave). In most other parts of the country, the second heat wave lasted for 17 days.

United Kingdom

At 14:32 BST on Wednesday, 19 July 2006,  was recorded at Wisley, Surrey. This confirmed that the period of prolonged warm weather was a true heat wave. The United Kingdom's all-time temperature high of  attained at Faversham, Kent, on 10 August 2003 was not reached. 

This figure is generally deemed to be erroneous and it has been suggested that the recorded temperature was in fact . Another theory is that the  record on 18 July 2006 was recorded in the sunshine, not in standard 'shaded' areas. 

Similar temperatures were recorded in the sunshine during a brief heatwave at Wimbledon on 1 July 2015. Because of the northerly location and marine nature, it was not a heat wave in a general sense, but rather unusually warm weather.

However, in 2022, even hotter temperatures were met across the whole of the United Kingdom, with a record high of 40.3°C in Coningsby, Lincolnshire, which is the first officially acceptable temperature above 40°C in the UK 

Drought was an issue in many parts of the United Kingdom after a very dry winter. There was warning of drought occurring from the early months of 2006. Following the dry winter, with extreme temperatures occurring in the country and little rain, increasing strain  was put on water supplies, and hose-pipe bans were issued in many counties. The Environment Agency claimed that the UK may have had the most severe drought in 100 years.

Some power cuts occurred, after lightning strikes and some due to large amounts of electricity used by air conditioners. In Central London on 27 July 2006 a series of power cuts hit Piccadilly Circus, Regent Street, Turner Broadcasting UK and Oxford Circus causing the closure of shops and businesses, when pre-existing faults were worsened by heavy demand.

The Met Office confirmed that July 2006 was the warmest July, as well as the warmest single month, overall, across the UK, and a number of regional records were also broken.

The tarmac on some roads melted in England, requiring application of crushed rock dust.

Germany
In Germany most of the July temperature average records were broken. Such numbers were recorded all over Germany. The biggest problem was the precipitation, which mostly fell in intense thunderstorms. At least 20 people died in this heatwave.

Denmark
It was also the sunniest July ever, and the second-sunniest ever, at 321 hours. In fact, the previous July record was 290 hours. Since Denmark escaped the extremes seen further south, it is now known as one of the best summer months in history.
On 6 July, the temperature reached 36.0°C in Odense.

France
High temperatures in France destroyed many crops, just days before the harvest period, while French officials said at least 40 people were confirmed to have been killed by the heat wave directly. July 2006 was in many regions the warmest July ever recorded (and often the second warmest month after August 2003). In many regions weather was particularly stormy. In Nice, the all-time high temperature record was beaten with a  recorded on 1 August.

Ireland
Ireland was affected from the heat wave from the start of June, and the warm weather continued until the end of July.

Temperatures were well above average for both months. July 2006 was the warmest July in Ireland since records began. By the end of July, temperatures returned to average figures.

Despite the high daytime temperatures, night time temperatures were sometimes below average ( in June;  in July). The cool night time temperatures are thought to have made the heat wave more bearable there.

Sunshine levels were very high all over the country, with 257 hours (~8.6 hours a day) of sunshine recorded at Cork Airport, County Cork in June (making it the sunniest June since records began) and 283 hours (~9.1 hours a day) of sunshine at Rosslare, County Wexford in July (sunniest July since 1990). The sunniest day during the two months (and indeed, the year) was on 25 June, when Malin Head, County Donegal, recorded 15.8 hours of sunshine.

Parts of Munster and Leinster also recorded 21 days between 28 May and 17 June where no rainfall was recorded. There was also a period between 9 July and 27 July when no rainfall was recorded in Greater Dublin. Despite the low rainfall, drought was not an issue in Ireland.

In Ireland, May 2006 was the warmest for 20 years and sunniest since 2000. June 2006 was the sunniest on record, driest since 1995 and also one of the warmest. July 2006 was the warmest on record, sunniest in 15 years and also driest since 1989. August 2006 was average. 

September 2006 was the warmest on record. October 2006 was the warmest in many places since 2001 and sunniest since 2000. November 2006 was warmer and sunnier than usual. Overall, Summer 2006 (June, July and August) was the sunniest, driest and warmest summer since 1995 and one of the sunniest, driest and warmest on record. Autumn 2006 (September, October, November) was the warmest on record in many places, and sunshine levels were well above normal. Rainfall levels were also above average.

The months of June and July 2006 are regarded as one of the best summers ever due to the high levels of sunshine, warm temperatures and low rainfall. Drought and health problems were not an issue in Ireland, unlike many parts of Europe – mostly because the heat was not as severe there.

Netherlands
July 2006

The Four Day Marches of Nijmegen were cancelled after only one day as hundreds of people collapsed the first day, two of them eventually dying due to fatal heat stroke. The walking people had to walk on open roads without any shade and there was not enough water for everyone. Paramedics had their hands full with hundreds of people who fainted due to the heat. Vierdaagse

The highest temperature was recorded on 19 July, when temperatures reached the mid- to upper 30s °C (mid- to upper 90s °F) for most of the country, especially in the south-east. The all-time record for the month of July was broken.

At some places especially in the south-east of the Netherlands temperatures passed  for 15 or 16 days. The average daytime temperature for the month was  again in the south-east of the Netherlands. The lowest daytime temperature was at some locations  for the whole month of July.

During days when temperatures reached  or higher, and on days without wind, the smog level was very high. Warnings were broadcast on television and radio, advising people to stay indoors as much as possible because the air pollution was very unhealthy, the smog was very strong and it was dangerously hot.

The Netherlands also had to deal with extreme drought in June and July. Because of the extreme heat and drought vegetation was very dry, and the humidity levels were very low, causing brushfires.

On 30 January 2007, the United Nations published a report of all countries in the world with the most deaths related to natural disasters for 2006. The Netherlands appeared fourth place, with 1,000 heat-related deaths.
On 19 July, the temperature reached 37.1°C in Westdorpe.

Poland
July 2006 was the warmest in Poland since the beginning of the meteorological measurements (i.e. 1779). For most of the month, the maximum temperature exceeded  – even at night it rarely fell below . The average temperature was more than  higher than normal, for example in Warsaw the average temperature in July 2006 is usually , in Wrocław , and in Poznań . The highest temperature was recorded in Słubice, near the German border . After the hot days, the temperature at night dropped very slowly.

July 2006 was also extremely dry. In many regions it did not rain for 3–4 weeks. The river water levels were the lowest ever reported in Polish history and in the absence of rain, many crops dried up.

July 2006 in most Polish cities saw 300–350 sunshine hours (normally 220–240 sunshine hours): the highest number being in Poznań (373 sunshine hours) and in Warsaw (355 sunshine hours).

Post 2006:

July 2007 was AGAIN normal month in Poland. Temperature rarely exceed  and it was warm, wet and wild. In many regions, including Elblag rained and it was stormy. Many crops returned to normal business, temperature rarely at night exceed  and it was Cloudy, and sunny.

Sweden
According to the Swedish Meteorological and Hydrological Institute (SMHI), the city of Lund in Skåne in southern Sweden had the highest average temperatures for the month of July since records began in 1859. The rest of Sweden has however not broken the daily average temperatures from the record year 1994.

This is the highest temperature recorded in the country since July 1994 when Kalmar and Söderhamn had .
Målilla and Ultuna are the places where the highest temperature ever in Sweden was recorded, in 1947 and 1933 respectively.

Russia
Absolute maxima of July 2006 have been broken in
 Pskov +
 Saint Petersburg +

The warmest July in
 Kaliningrad +

Period after the heat wave
Due to the extreme heat in July 2006, the ocean water reached a temperature normally reached in September. This increase in water temperature led to faster evaporation of ocean waters, making August one of the cloudiest and wettest months in recorded history in various western European countries. Many weather experts report this to be a direct consequence of the heat wave, as the high evaporation rate caused the atmosphere to generate many low pressure areas.

Despite this, September 2006 was again the warmest September on record, in the UK and elsewhere, due to high ocean temperatures, altered atmospheric pressure zones, and consequent different wind directions over Europe. The pressure zone changes were a consequence of the extra-tropical remnants of Atlantic hurricanes settling over the British Isles.

In the Netherlands
Just two months after July 2006, September 2006 became the warmest September since official measurements started. Additionally, October 2006 and November 2006 broke several temperature records. October was one of the warmest Octobers since measurements began, and November went into the record books as the second warmest November since official measurements started three hundred years prior. The winter of 2006/2007 was the warmest in three hundred years as well, and so was the following spring.

Temperatures reached a record-breaking  as early as 15 April.

Such a sequence of events is unheard of in the Netherlands meteorological history, estimated to happen every 8,000 years when not taking global warming into account. It's been a result of a unique mixture of the hot summer increasing marine temperatures and Northern Atlantic hurricanes settling as depressions off the coast of Scotland, giving the European continent a constant stream of southern, fast winds rendering it unable to cool down from the Mediterranean through to northern Europe.

In Belgium
After the record-breaking month of July, August broke records on the opposite end. August 2006 was extremely rainy.

December 2006 continued the warm trend.

As of 2021, this record still stands firmly.

2007 has broken many records as well. January 2007 broke every temperature record (minimum, maximum and average). February 2007 set some daily records and was 2 °C warmer than normal.

The winter of 2007, just like the previous autumn season, has also been the warmest in recorded history.

March 2007 was the 6th warmest month in history, just 0.8 °C less than the record at that time. April 2007 broke the all-time temperature records once again, as the average temperature had been 5 °C warmer than normal. Kleine Brogel had two tropical days on 15 and 16 April 2007 ( and ), which have been the earliest dates any place in Belgium had ever seen temperatures at or over 30°C. May started warmer than normal, but a 9-month warmth streak eventually came to an end when June returned to average temperatures around normal.

In Finland
The summer of 2006 was around 2 °C warmer than the 1971–2000 average. While the heat was not record breaking, the drought was: less than half of the average summer rainfall was received in large areas, and almost all of the country received less than 75% of the usual rain. In many localities (such as Jokioinen, Kajaani and Rovaniemi, it was the driest summer on record.  Autumn 2006 was also  warmer than the average. While this didn't break any records, an unprecedented period of mild weather began around the middle of November.

December 2006 was the warmest December ever recorded in Finland. Similar records were broken across the southern and central parts of the country, while in the north the old records narrowly remained in place.

The mild weather continued well into January 2007. On January 10, many places in southern Finland observed record highs for January. (The national record high for January,  set at Mariehamn in 1973, remained in place.) As a whole, the two months leading to 16 January were the mildest such period ever recorded in Finland. In the second half of January, temperatures plunged  and February 2007 was well below the average over 1971 to 2000.

In France
After the unusually hot July, August brought a big contrast with cool weather, cloudy skies and pretty wet weather patterns all around the country, with the exception of the Mediterranean coast.

September however turned to be very warm and sunny and in many parts of France it was the warmest in 50 years. October too was very warm and so was November, triggering in many regions the warmest autumn in recorded history.

December, January and February also brought extremely mild weather making the winter of 2006/2007 the warmest in recorded history.

March was relatively uneventful with average temperatures and precipitations. However April broke the record for the warmest April on record. In many regions it was also the sunniest (with almost uninterrupted sunshine for the whole 30 days) and the driest April on record. In northern and north-eastern France the departure from the normal of the average temperature was as high as 5 °C (9 °F). May was too very warm making the spring 2007 the warmest in recorded history for some regions.

In the United Kingdom
Like the rest of Western Europe, August 2006 saw a dramatic turnaround, being a cloudy and wet month in many parts with daytime maxima below average – although the Central England Temperature (CET) was close to the long-term average, due to the cloud keeping night minima higher than normal. The month was notable for its lack of heat waves, being the first August since 1993 when ) was not recorded anywhere in the country.   However, August 2008, which followed a much cooler July, was even duller and wetter. August 2010 again followed a similar pattern.

September 2006 was just as record-breaking as July, being the warmest on record and just as exceptionally, warmer than August had been. October and November, although not beating the records for the warmest set in 2001 and 1994 respectively, were also much warmer than average.

Winter 2006/07 was exceptionally mild, the warmest since 1868/69.

April 2007 was another record-breaker, with a CET of  the warmest in over 300 years of temperature records and by a large margin (10.6c being previous record) remarkably this was smashed just 4 years later in 2011 with a CET of ! Temperatures were widely above , with over 200 hours of sunshine for much of the country. Parts of south-eastern Britain had no rain all month.

In Poland
After a hot and dry July, August 2006 was cold and very rainy. The average temperature hovered slightly below the long-term standards. At the beginning of the month in the west of the country experienced torrential rains and violent storms. In Wrocław decreased  of water; that is 4 times more than usual. As a result of heavy rains came the floods, which affected mainly Lower Silesia.

For a change September 2006 was warm and dry. In the west, that month was more than  warmer than the norm. In Słubice the average temperature was until . Early September brought gusty winds in Poland, near Bydgoszcz in Kuyavian-Pomeranian Voivodeship tornado passed, which escaped with the roots of several hundred trees.

October 2006 is also inscribed as one of the warmer in the history of meteorological measurements, as well as very dry. It was also very sunny month, because reported about 150 sunshine hours.

November 2006 in Poland was the warmest from 10 years. Like in October the wind was blowing strongly, particularly on the coast of the Baltic Sea. At the end of the month, thick fog blocked airports in Warsaw, Kraków and Wrocław to 3 days.

Winter 2006/2007 was extremely warm and rainy, in many cities, the snow lay only a few days, and rain fell for MANY days. At night the temperature increased up to  degrees, which at this time of year, it was an unprecedented phenomenon.

This conclusion was the warmest winter since the measurements. Summer 2007 was not that dry.

In Russia
December 2006 and January 2007 were the warmest months in Moscow, Saint Petersburg, Kazan and other cities of European Russia.

March 2007 was the warmest month in Moscow (+) with a record maximum +

In May 2007 the absolute maximum of month in many cities has been established:
 Tambov +
 Rostov-on-Don +
 Kazan +
 Moscow +

2007 and 2008 became the warmest years in Moscow history with average year temperatures + (2nd) and + (1st).

See also
 1995 Chicago heat wave
 2003 European heat wave
 2006 North American heat wave
 The Northern Hemisphere Summer heat wave of 2010
 2015 European heat waves 
 2018 European heat wave

References

External links
  German site
  Dutch Site (KNMI)
 British site
 Heat wave in UK (Philip Eden)
 RMI website
 RTÉ News Irish news article
 CNN article on heat wave
  Belgian Site (VRT News)
 Humidex graph for British weather forecasts !Updates!
  Swedish news site (DN) 
  Climate statistics of the Finnish Meteorological Institute

European heat wave
European heat wave
Heat waves in Europe
European Heat Wave, 2006
European Heat Wave, 2006
Heat Wave
Heat Wave
Climate change in Europe